
Faberstown is a settlement in the civil parish of Ludgershall, Wiltshire, England.

At the beginning of the 20th century a local Member of Parliament, Walter Faber, began building houses to the east of the village of Ludgershall, on land in Hampshire. This settlement became known as Faberstown. By 1970 Ludgershall and Faberstown were in essence a single village, and in 1992 a boundary change brought Faberstown into Wiltshire from Hampshire.

References

Hamlets in Wiltshire
Ludgershall, Wiltshire